The Río Grande Fire Station, at 6 Juan R. González Street at Del Carmen Street in Río Grande, Puerto Rico.  It was noted in the NRIS database of the National Register of Historic Places in 2012, but may not have actually been listed then;  its listing status was "DR".

References

Fire stations on the National Register of Historic Places in Puerto Rico
Art Deco architecture in Puerto Rico
1951 establishments in Puerto Rico
Government buildings completed in 1951
Río Grande, Puerto Rico